This is a list of notable players who have played for Zob Ahan Football Club by decade.

List of players

Notes
A.  Mehdi Rajabzadeh is top goal scorer of 2006–07 with 17 goals.

References

Zob Ahan Esfahan F.C.

Association football player non-biographical articles
Zob Ahan